Larteh is a language of southeastern Ghana. It belongs to the Guang subgroup of the Niger-Congo languages and is spoken by about 74,000 people.

References

Guang languages
Languages of Ghana